Evangelos Koskinas (born 10 May 1959) is a Greek swimmer. He competed in three events at the 1980 Summer Olympics.

References

1959 births
Living people
Greek male swimmers
Olympic swimmers of Greece
Swimmers at the 1980 Summer Olympics
Sportspeople from Piraeus